The Blessed Sacrament Chapel at Saint Mary-of-the-Woods, Indiana is on the motherhouse grounds of the Sisters of Providence of Saint Mary-of-the-Woods. Its primary function is as a location for Eucharistic adoration by the Sisters of Providence and members of the public.

History
Saint Mother Theodore Guerin, who came to Saint Mary-of-the-Woods, Indiana with several companions in 1840 and founded the Sisters of Providence, had a strong devotion to the Blessed Sacrament. In December 1913, Pope Pius X gave the sisters permission to hold perpetual Eucharistic adoration, which began at Saint Mary's in a different location on June 10, 1914. For decades the Sisters of Providence had wanted a specific Chapel of Perpetual Adoration, but this was not achieved until the 1920s under the leadership of General Superior Mother Mary Cleophas Foley.

Ground was broken on April 9, 1920, and the cornerstone was laid on June 7 of that year. The building was consecrated on May 19, 1924, by Bishop Joseph Chartrand of the Archdiocese of Indianapolis. He designated the chapel Chapel of Divine Love, though the sisters referred to it simply as the Blessed Sacrament Chapel.

Interior and art
The chapel is built in the Italian Renaissance style with a barrel-vault ceiling. It was designed by D.A. Bohlen & Son of Indianapolis. Funded in large part through donations from the families and friends of Sisters of Providence, the chapel features multiple types of marble, gold, and silver.

The chapel's focal point is a Carrara marble baldachin. Carved from one piece of marble by the Deprato Company of Pietrasanta, Italy, the baldachin weighs 8,000 pounds.

Nine stained glass windows of Tiffany glass are found in the chapel: four on each side and one rose window of the Holy Spirit above the entrance. The windows were designed specifically for the space and were executed in the Royal Bavarian Studios in Munich, Germany. In order to encourage undivided attention on the Blessed Sacrament, no figures are pictured in the windows.

See also
 List of churches in the Roman Catholic Archdiocese of Indianapolis

References

External links
 Sisters of Providence of Saint Mary-of-the-Woods
 Interactive panoramic view of the Blessed Sacrament Chapel by Rack Photography

Churches in Vigo County, Indiana
Churches in the Roman Catholic Archdiocese of Indianapolis
Roman Catholic chapels in the United States
Sisters of Providence of Saint Mary-of-the-Woods
Tourist attractions in Vigo County, Indiana
Buildings and structures in Saint Mary-of-the-Woods, Indiana
Roman Catholic churches completed in 1924
1924 establishments in Indiana
20th-century Roman Catholic church buildings in the United States